Elections to North Lincolnshire Council were held on 3 May 2007.  The Conservative Party lost its overall majority to the Labour Party.  Overall turnout was 32%.

Election result

There were 3 vacant seats on the council due to the death of Cllr Dick Long. They were in the Brigg and Wolds ward and were filled in a by-election on 14 June 2007 by Conservative candidates. Before this by-election took place, Cllr Don Stewart of the Axholme South ward defected from the Conservatives, choosing to sit as an Independent. Therefore, the composition of the council after the election was:

References

2007 English local elections
2007
2000s in Lincolnshire